Ma Bufang Mansion was the mansion of the Chinese Muslim warlord and General Ma Bufang and his family from 1943 to 1949, and now is a tourist attraction, in Xining, Qinghai, China. Ma Bufang was a Kuomintang party member, so the mansion has numerous portraits of the Kuomintang founder Sun Yat-sen and Blue Sky with a White Sun flags.

It also includes many portraits of Ma Clique warlords.

Construction initiated in June 1942 and finished in June 1943. In total, the mansion comprises 290 rooms occupying 6,000 square meters of a plot of 30,000 square metres located in East District of the city.

See also

 Kuomintang

References

Links to Images of Ma Bufang Mansion
《马步芳公馆》小游
一个景点：马步芳公馆
馨庐：马步芳公馆一日游
青海之旅——马步芳公馆（组图）
那就是青藏高原---马步芳公馆
马步芳公馆

External links
 中国青海西宁4A级景区马步芳公馆
 The Mansion of Ma Bufang
 國寶老宅馨廬－－馬步芳公館

Historic house museums in China
Houses in China
Museums in Qinghai
Houses completed in 1943